The Ouadi-Rimé Ouadi-Hachim Faunal Reserve, is located in the Batha administrative region/province in the center of Chad. It an IUCN Category IV area, which was established in 1969. At  –equivalent to the size of Scotland– it is one of the largest reserves in the world.

Geography
The Ouadi Rimé–Ouadi Achim, covering three habitats of Sahelian wooded grassland, sub-desert grassland (covers about 66% of the area), and desert, and is one of the largest reserves in Chad. Its terrain with an elevation range of  has no prominent features except for an isolated patch of a remnant of volcanic eruption. It has a long dune cordon called the Goz Kerky that runs through the reserve in a north–south direction. The reserve also flood plains which are inundated temporarily and along with the streams help in creation of the biodiversity of the reserve.

Flora
Acacia senegal, Balanites aegyptiaca, Combretum glutinosum and Boscia senegalensis are the plant types in the Sahelian grassland. Plant species Aristida mutabilis, Chloris prieurii and Cenchrus biflorus, herbs Limeum viscosum, Indigofera hochstetteri and Blepharis linariifolia are  recorded in the desert zone; the dune depressions have Acacia tortilis. Also noted are clumps of Cornulaca monacantha in the deserts.

Fauna
Faunal species noted are dama gazelle (Gazella dama, CR), Dorcas gazelle (Gazella dorcas, VU), red-fronted gazelle (Gazella rufifrons, VU), Sudan cheetah (Acinonyx jubatus soemmeringii, VU) and addax (Addax nasomaculatus, CR) but the presence of the last two species is now in doubt. The scimitar oryx had its last stronghold in this reserve before eventually going extinct in the wild.
Subsequently, a reintroduction program for the species selected Ouadi Rimé-Ouadi Achim to reintroduce it in the wild; as a result, since 2016 a small herd is living within the reserve limits.

Avi fauna reported includes 267 bird species and also three species of the Sudan–Guinea Savanna biome. During the rainy season migrant Palearctic waterbirds flock to the streams in large numbers.

Conservation
Though created primarily to protect the fauna in the reserve there are hardly any personnel posted for the purpose. The problem of water shortage due to reduced incidence of rainfall deep tube wells has provided the needed water sources. However, hunting is widely prevalent. Falcon hunters from Persian Gulf who visit the reserve for hunting of bustards and gazelles have been prevented from operating in the reserve under local pressure.

References

Faunal reserves
Protected areas of Chad